The Blasphemy Act 1697 (9 Will 3 c 35) was an Act of the Parliament of England. It made it an offence for any person, educated in or having made profession of the Christian religion, by writing, preaching, teaching or advised speaking, to deny the Holy Trinity, to claim there is more than one god, to deny the truth of Christianity and to deny the Bible as divine authority.

The first offence resulted in being rendered incapable of holding any office or place of trust. The second offence resulted in being rendered incapable of bringing any action, of being guardian or executor, or of taking a legacy or deed of gift, and three years imprisonment without bail.

The Act was directed against apostates at the beginning of the deist movement in England, particularly after the 1696 publication of John Toland's book Christianity not Mysterious.

It was rarely applied: the legislation allowed only four days after the offence for a formal complaint to be lodged and the trial itself was required to be held within three months. As a result, existing common law process continued to be the first line against heterodoxy in England and Wales.

The Trinitarian provision was amended by the Doctrine of the Trinity Act 1813 to remove the penalties from Unitarians.

The Law Commission said that they were not aware of any prosecutions that had taken place under this Act.

On 24 May 1966, the Law Commission said that the offence created by this statute was obsolete and recommended that the whole Act be repealed. Their recommendation was implemented by section 13(2) of, and  Part I of Schedule 4 to, the Criminal Law Act 1967.

For the effect of this Act on the common law offences, see Blasphemy law in the United Kingdom - Relationship between the common law and statutory offences.

See also
Blasphemy law in the United Kingdom

Notes

Sources 
 Webb, R.K. "From Toleration to Religious Liberty" Liberty Secured? Britain before and after 1688 Edited by J.R. Jones (Stanford: Stanford University Press, 1992) p 162 

Acts of the Parliament of England concerning religion
Christianity and law in the 17th century
1698 in law
1698 in England
Blasphemy law in Europe
1698 in Christianity
Church of Scotland